Nicolaas Peter Paul Rubens, Lord of Rameyen (1618–1655) was a son of the painter Peter Paul Rubens and Isabella Brant.

Family 

Rubens married Constancia Helman (1609-1678) in 1640, who was the daughter of Ferdinand Helman, Schepen of Antwerp and Catherine vander Veken, both of whom are buried in Saint James' Church.

Nicolaas Rubens, Lord of Rameyen
1.0.0/ Albert Maria Rubens, Lord of Rameyen (1642-1672): alderman of Antwerp. marr. Catharina Vecquemans.
1.1.0/ Maria Catharina Rubens (1672-1710): married to Alexander IV Goubau, Lord of Mespelaere, (1658-1712): Grand Almoner of Antwerp.
1.1.1./ Georges Alexander Goubau, Lord of Mespelaer (1697-1760) : marr. Maria Bosschaert.
2.0.0/Jan Nicolaas Rubens, Lord of Rameyen (1648-1713):marr. Cornelie Constantia Helman, daughter of the Lord of Waesbeeke.
 2.1.0/ Cornelia Paulina Philippine Rubens (1677-1738): married to Honore Henri, Count of Esbeke, Viscount de Haeghen, lord of Riviere d'Arschot, (1659-1739).
 2.1.1/ Nicolas Clement Honore van der Hagen, died 1729.
 2.1.2/ Constantia Honorine Theresia van der Hagen, Countess d'Esbeke, marr. Ferdinand philippe de Vischer, Baron of Celles: Lord mayor of Brussels.
3.0.0/ Theresia Constantia Rubens (1691-1764): marr. Eugene vander Dussen, Lord of Bornival and Baron of the Holy Roman Empire (1683-1745). Their branche has become extinct.

Career 
He is portrayed often as a young child by his illustrious father, in altarpieces and portraits.
In 1643 he bought the Heerlijkheid of Rameyen (or Ramay) with the fortune he inherited of his father. His secondary residence was Hof van Ursele, heritage of his father who bought it on 29 May 1627.

References

See also
Rubens family

1618 births
1655 deaths
Ni
Flemish nobility